The Milan Triennial IX was the Triennial in Milan sanctioned by the Bureau of International Expositions (BIE) on the 7 June 1950.
Its theme was Goods - Standard. 
It was held at the Palazzo dell'Arte and ran from 
12 May 1951 to 5 November 1951. 

Tapio Wirkkala, 
Rut Bryk snd 
Dora Jung
all won Grand Prix, with Birger Kaipiainen receiving an honorable mention.
Toini Muona, 
Ilmari Tapiovaara
and
Kaj Franck won gold medals
and 
Lisa Johansson-Pape a silver one.

References 

1951 in Italy
Tourist attractions in Milan
World's fairs in Milan